Larry Hankin (born ) is an American character actor, performer, director, comedian, and producer. He is known for his major film roles as Charley Butts in Escape from Alcatraz (1979), Ace in Running Scared (1986), and Carl Alphonse in Billy Madison (1995). He had smaller roles as Doobie in Planes, Trains and Automobiles, Sergeant Larry Balzak in Home Alone, Mr. Heckles in Friends, and Joe in Breaking Bad and El Camino.

Early life and career
Hankin grew up in a Jewish family in Far Rockaway, Queens. He graduated from Far Rockaway High School and Syracuse University, where he befriended Carl Gottlieb. He was homeless at one point.

Notable film and television roles
Hankin was an early member of the Second City, training with improvisational theater legends Viola Spolin and Paul Sills, and in 1963 moved to San Francisco to co-found another influential improv troupe, The Committee. His first notable supporting role was as Pt. Romero in Viva Max! in 1969.

He is known for his roles in TV shows Breaking Bad, Matlock, Friends (as Mr. Heckles) and Seinfeld (as Tom Pepper), as well as for his major role in Escape from Alcatraz (1979) with Clint Eastwood. He also acted in How Sweet It Is! (1968) with Debbie Reynolds and James Garner and the Adam Sandler movie Billy Madison (1995). He had cameo appearances in three John Hughes films,  Planes, Trains and Automobiles (1987); She's Having a Baby (1988); and Home Alone (1990); which coincidentally featured Roberts Blossom (playing Old Man Marley), whom he co-starred with in Escape from Alcatraz.  He had brief appearances in Pretty Woman as the landlord (1990), as well as minor roles in Loose Shoes (1980), The Sure Thing (1985), and Running Scared (1986). Hankin also appeared in Married... with Children, as well as one of the Halloween specials of Home Improvement.  Hankin also appeared in three episodes of Star Trek: Voyager as Gaunt Gary and one episode of Star Trek: The Next Generation. Hankin and Curtis Armstrong played the hippie entrepreneurs who purchased "Buy the Book" (the bookstore where the titular character works at) on Ellen.

On Seinfeld, Hankin portrayed Tom Pepper, the actor cast as Kramer on the pilot-within-a-TV-show Jerry. He portrayed a homeless man in season 5 of Malcolm in the Middle. He then appeared again with Bryan Cranston in seasons three and five of Breaking Bad as junkyard owner Old Joe. He reprised his old role from Breaking Bad in the Netflix sequel film El Camino: A Breaking Bad Movie.

Other work
One of Hankin's earliest roles was playing the lead character of Farley in the 1964 educational film Too Tough to Care.

In 1977, Hankin appeared in the episode "The Bums vs. the Reds" of the situation comedy The San Pedro Beach Bums. He also played Mickey the Bartender in a WKRP in Cincinnati episode called "Hotel Oceanview" that also has a cameo appearance by Dr. Joyce Brothers as "Vicky Von Vicky".

In 1982, he played the dog catcher that tries to take Sandy in Annie.

In 1980, Hankin's short film Solly's Diner earned him and the film's producers a nomination for the Academy Award for Best Live Action Short Film.

Hankin was a founding member of the commedia dell'arte improvisation group The Committee in 1963, located at an indoor bocce ball court in San Francisco's North Beach district.

He appeared in the Janet Jackson music video for her 1986 hit single "What Have You Done for Me Lately" as a cook/waiter.

He portrayed a depressed Chechen hitman in the HBO series Barry in 2018.

In 2021, he appeared in Friends: The Reunion.

Other interests
He has been doing work with the online comedy group "Magic Hugs", and has appeared in a number of their sketches, as well as the series Baby Mentalist for Channel 101.

Filmography

Film

T.V. Series

Music videos

References

External links
 

 YouTube page

20th-century American male actors
21st-century American male actors
American male film actors
American male television actors
Male actors from New York City
Syracuse University alumni
Living people
Year of birth missing (living people)